Vibeke Fürst Haugen (born 20 May 1968) is a Norwegian media executive. From 2022 she serves as Director-General of the Norwegian Broadcasting Corporation.

Career
Born in Oslo on 20 May 1968, Fürst Haugen graduated as cand.mag. from the University of Oslo in 1994, and has later had further education from the Norwegian School of Economics and Harvard University.

Working for the broadcasting company NRK from 1994, she eventually assumed various administrative positions. She was appointed Director-General of the Norwegian Broadcasting Corporation in 2022, succeeding Thor Gjermund Eriksen.

References

1968 births
Living people
People from Oslo
University of Oslo alumni
Norwegian School of Economics alumni
Harvard University alumni
Norwegian chief executives
NRK people